Henry Louis Gehrig (born Heinrich Ludwig Gehrig ; June 19, 1903June 2, 1941) was an American professional baseball first baseman who played 17 seasons in Major League Baseball (MLB) for the New York Yankees (1923–1939). Gehrig was renowned for his prowess as a hitter and for his durability, which earned him his nickname "the Iron Horse". He is widely regarded as one of the greatest baseball players of all time. He was an All-Star seven consecutive times, a Triple Crown winner once, an American League (AL) Most Valuable Player twice, and a member of six World Series champion teams. He had a career .340 batting average, .632 slugging average, and a .447 on base average. He hit 493 home runs and had 1,995 runs batted in (RBI). He still has the highest ratio of runs scored plus runs batted in per 100 plate appearances (35.08) and per 100 games (156.7) among Hall of Fame players. In 1939, he was elected to the Baseball Hall of Fame and was the first MLB player to have his uniform number (4) retired by a team.

A native of New York City and a student at Columbia University, Gehrig signed with the Yankees on April 29, 1923. He set several major-league records during his career, including the most career grand slams (23; since broken by Alex Rodriguez) and most consecutive games played (2,130), a record that stood for 56 years and was long considered unbreakable until surpassed by Cal Ripken Jr., in 1995. Gehrig's consecutive game streak ended on May 2, 1939, when he voluntarily took himself out of the lineup, stunning both players and fans, after his performance on the field became hampered by an undiagnosed ailment subsequently confirmed to be amyotrophic lateral sclerosis; ALS is an incurable neuromuscular illness, now commonly referred to in much of the world as "Lou Gehrig's disease."

The disease forced him to retire at age 36, and claimed his life two years later. The pathos of his farewell from baseball was capped off by his iconic 1939 "Luckiest Man on the Face of the Earth" speech at Yankee Stadium.
In 1969, the Baseball Writers' Association of America voted Gehrig the greatest first baseman of all time, and he was the leading vote-getter on the MLB All-Century Team chosen by fans in 1999. A monument in Gehrig's honor, originally dedicated by the Yankees in 1941, currently resides in Monument Park at Yankee Stadium. The Lou Gehrig Memorial Award is given annually to the MLB player who best exhibits Gehrig's integrity and character.

Early life
Gehrig was born June 19, 1903, at 1994 Second Avenue (according to his birth certificate) in the Yorkville neighborhood of Manhattan; he weighed almost  at birth. He was the second of four children of German immigrants, Christina Foch (1881–1954) and Heinrich Gehrig (1867–1946). His father was a sheet-metal worker by trade who was frequently unemployed due to alcoholism and epilepsy, and his mother, a maid, was the main breadwinner and disciplinarian in the family. Gehrig was the only one of the four siblings to live past childhood. His two sisters died at an early age from whooping cough and measles; a brother also died in infancy. From an early age, Gehrig helped his mother with work, doing tasks such as folding laundry and picking up supplies from the local stores. Gehrig spoke German during his childhood, not learning English until the age of five. In 1910 he lived with his parents at 2266 Amsterdam Avenue in Washington Heights. In 1920 the family resided on 8th Avenue in Manhattan. His name was often anglicized to Henry Louis Gehrig but he was known as "Lou" so he would not be confused with his identically named father, who was known as Henry.Gehrig first garnered national attention for his baseball ability while playing in a game at Cubs Park (now Wrigley Field) in Chicago on June 26, 1920. His New York School of Commerce team was playing a local team from Lane Tech High School in front of a crowd of more than 10,000 spectators. With his team leading 8–6 in the top of the ninth inning, Gehrig hit a grand slam completely out of the major league park, which was an unheard-of feat for a 17-year-old.Gehrig attended PS 132 in the Washington Heights section of Manhattan, then went to Commerce High School, graduating in 1921. He then studied engineering at Columbia University for two years, finding the schoolwork difficult before leaving to pursue a career in professional baseball. He had been recruited to play football at the school, earning a scholarship there, later joining the baseball squad. Before his first semester began, New York Giants manager John McGraw advised him to play summer professional baseball under an assumed name, Henry Lewis, despite the fact that it could jeopardize his collegiate sports eligibility. After he played a dozen games for the Hartford Senators in the Eastern League, he was discovered and banned from collegiate sports his freshman year. In 1922 Gehrig returned to collegiate sports as a fullback for the Columbia Lions football program. Later, in 1923, he played first base and pitched for the Columbia baseball team. At Columbia, he was a member of the Phi Delta Theta fraternity.

On April 18, 1923, the same day Yankee Stadium opened for the first time and Babe Ruth inaugurated the new stadium with a home run against the Boston Red Sox, Columbia pitcher Gehrig struck out 17 Williams Ephs batters to set a team record, though Columbia lost the game. Only a handful of collegians were at Columbia's South Field that day, but more significant was the presence of Yankee scout Paul Krichell, who had been trailing Gehrig for some time. Gehrig's pitching did not particularly impress him; rather, it was Gehrig's powerful left-handed hitting. Krichell observed Gehrig hit some of the longest home runs ever seen on various eastern campuses, including a  home run on April 28 at South Field, which landed at 116th Street and Broadway. Scouts saw Gehrig as "the next Babe Ruth"; he signed a contract with the Yankees on April 30. Gehrig returned to the minor-league Hartford Senators to play parts of two seasons, 1923 and 1924, batting .344 and hitting 61 home runs in 193 games. Except for his games with Hartford, a two-hour car ride away, Gehrig would play his entire baseball life — sandlot, high school, college and professional — with teams based in New York City.

Major league career

New York Yankees (1923–1939)

Gehrig joined the New York Yankees midway through the 1923 season and made his major-league debut as a pinch hitter at age 19 on June 15, 1923.  In his first two seasons, he was mired behind Yankee stalwart Wally Pipp at first base, a two-time AL home run champion and one of the premier power hitters in baseball's Deadball era. Gehrig saw limited playing time, mostly as a pinch hitter, playing in only 23 games and being left off the Yankees' 1923 World Series roster in spite of producing both years (with lofty batting averages of .423 in 1923 and .500 in 1924). Taking over for a slumping Pipp part way into 1925, he batted .295, with 20 home runs and 68 runs batted in (RBIs) over 126 games.

Unlike Ruth, Gehrig was not a gifted position player so he played first base, often the position for a strong hitter but weaker fielder. The 23-year-old Yankee's breakout season came in 1926, when he batted .313 with 47 doubles, an American League-leading 20 triples, 16 home runs, and 112 RBIs. In the 1926 World Series against the St. Louis Cardinals, Gehrig hit .348 with two doubles and four RBIs. The Cardinals won the series four games to three.

1927

In 1927, Gehrig put together one of the greatest seasons by any batter in history, hitting .373, with 218 hits: 101 singles, 52 doubles, 18 triples, 47 home runs, a then-record 175 RBIs (surpassing teammate Babe Ruth's 171 six years earlier), a .474 on-base percentage and a .765 slugging percentage. His 117 extra-base hits that season are second all-time to Babe Ruth's 119 extra-base hits in 1921 and his 447 total bases are third all-time, after Babe Ruth's 457 total bases in 1921 and Rogers Hornsby's 450 in 1922. Gehrig's production helped the 1927 Yankees to a 110–44 record, the AL pennant (by 19 games), and a four-game sweep of the Pittsburgh Pirates in the World Series.

Although the AL recognized his season by naming him league MVP, Gehrig's accomplishments were overshadowed by Babe Ruth's record-breaking 60 home runs and the overall dominance of the 1927 Yankees, a team often cited as having the greatest lineup of all time – the famed "Murderers' Row". Ruth's celebrity was so great that Gehrig's ghostwritten syndicated newspaper column that year was called "Following the Babe".

1929
In 1929, the New York Yankees debuted wearing numbers on their uniforms. Gehrig wore number 4 because he hit behind Babe Ruth, who batted third in the lineup.

1932
In 1932, Gehrig became the first player in the 20th century to hit four home runs in a game, when he accomplished the feat on June 3 against the Philadelphia Athletics. He narrowly missed getting a fifth home run when Athletics center fielder Al Simmons made a leaping catch of another fly ball at the center-field fence. After the game, manager Joe McCarthy told him, "Well, Lou, nobody can take today away from you." On the same day, however, John McGraw announced his retirement after 30 years of managing the New York Giants. McGraw, not Gehrig, got the main headlines in the sports sections the next day.

1933
On August 17, 1933, Gehrig played in his 1,308th consecutive game against the St. Louis Browns at Sportsman's Park, which broke the longest consecutive games-played streak, held by Everett Scott. Scott attended as a guest of the Browns. Gehrig lived with his parents until 1933, when he was 30 years old. His mother ruined all of Gehrig's romances until he met Eleanor Twitchell (1904–1984) in 1932; they began dating the next year and married in September. She was the daughter of Chicago Parks Commissioner Frank Twitchell. She helped Gehrig leave his mother's influence and hired Christy Walsh, Ruth's sports agent; Walsh helped Gehrig become the first athlete on Wheaties boxes.

1934
On April 30, 1934, Gehrig hit his 300th home run versus the Washington Senators, becoming the second player to reach the milestone after Ruth. Gehrig won the American League Triple Crown in 1934, leading the league with 49 home runs, 166 RBIs, and a .363 batting average.

1936
In a 1936 World Series cover story about Gehrig and Carl Hubbell, Time proclaimed Gehrig "the game's No. 1 batsman", who "takes boyish pride in banging a baseball as far, and running around the bases as quickly, as possible". Also in 1936, at the urging of his wife, Gehrig agreed to hire Babe Ruth's agent, who, in turn, persuaded him to audition for the role of Tarzan in the independent film Tarzan's Revenge. Gehrig only got as far, though, as posing for a widely distributed, and embarrassing, photo of himself in a leopard-spotted costume. When Tarzan creator Edgar Rice Burroughs spotted the outfit, he telegrammed Gehrig, "I want to congratulate you on being a swell first baseman." Producer Sol Lesser was unimpressed with Gehrig's legs, calling them "more functional than decorative," and passed on him for the role which eventually went to the 1936 Olympic decathlon gold medalist Glenn Morris.

2,130 consecutive games
On June 1, 1925, Gehrig entered the game as a pinch hitter, substituting for shortstop Paul "Pee Wee" Wanninger. The next day, June 2, Yankee manager Miller Huggins started Gehrig in place of regular first baseman Wally Pipp, who had a headache. Pipp was in a slump, as was the team, so Huggins made several lineup changes in an attempt to boost their performance, replacing Pipp, Aaron Ward, and Wally Schang. Fourteen years later, Gehrig had played 2,130 consecutive games, shattering the previous record of 1,307 along the way.

During the streak sportswriters in 1931 nicknamed Gehrig "the Iron Horse". In a few instances, Gehrig managed to keep the streak intact through pinch-hitting appearances and fortuitous timing; in others, the streak continued despite injuries. For example:
 On April 23, 1933, a pitch by Washington Senators pitcher Earl Whitehill struck Gehrig in the head. Although almost knocked unconscious, Gehrig remained in the game.
 On June 14, 1933, Gehrig was ejected from a game, along with manager Joe McCarthy, but he had already been at bat.
 In a June 1934 exhibition game, Gehrig was hit by a pitch just above the right eye and was knocked unconscious. According to news reports, he was out for five minutes. Batting helmets were not commonly used until the 1940s. He left the game, but was in the lineup the next day.
 On July 13, 1934, Gehrig suffered a "lumbago attack" and had to be assisted off the field. In the next day's away game, he was listed in the lineup as "shortstop", batting lead-off. In his first and only plate appearance, he singled and was promptly replaced by a pinch runner to rest his throbbing back, never taking the field. A&E's Biography speculated that this illness, which he also described as "a cold in his back", might have been the first symptom of his debilitating disease.

In addition, x-rays taken late in his life disclosed that Gehrig had sustained several fractures during his playing career, although he remained in the lineup despite those previously undisclosed injuries. However, the streak was helped when Yankees general manager Ed Barrow postponed a game as a rainout on a day when Gehrig was sick with the flu, though it was not raining.

He was also persuaded, but not convinced, by his wife, Eleanor, to end the streak at 1,999 games by acting sick, as he had already played through flu bouts before, and already had a nearly 700-game lead over the previous record. Gehrig's record of 2,130 consecutive games endured for 56 years until Baltimore Orioles shortstop Cal Ripken Jr. surpassed it on September 6, 1995; Ripken finished with 2,632 consecutive games.

Illness
Although his performance in the second half of the 1938 season was slightly better than in the first half, Gehrig reported physical changes at the midway point. At the end of that season, he said, "I was tired mid-season. I don't know why, but I just couldn't get going again." Although his final 1938 statistics were above average (.295 batting average, 114 RBIs, 170 hits, .523 slugging percentage, 689 plate appearances with only 75 strikeouts, and 29 home runs), boosted by a hot August, they were significantly down from his 1937 season, in which he batted .351 and slugged .643. He hit his last home run on 27 September 1938. In the 1938 World Series, he had four hits in 14 at-bats (.286 batting average), all singles. When the Yankees began their 1939 spring training in St. Petersburg, Florida, Gehrig clearly no longer possessed his once-formidable power. Even his base running was affected, and at one point he collapsed at Al Lang Stadium, then the Yankees' spring training park. By the end of spring training, he had not hit a home run. Throughout his career, Gehrig was considered an excellent base runner, but as the 1939 season got under way, his coordination and speed had deteriorated significantly.

By the end of April, his statistics were the worst of his career, with one RBI and a .143 batting average. Fans and the press openly speculated on Gehrig's abrupt decline. James Kahn, a reporter who wrote often about Gehrig, said in one article:

He was indeed meeting the ball, with only one strikeout in 28 at-bats. However, with Gehrig hitless in five of the first eight games, Joe McCarthy found himself resisting pressure from Yankee management to switch his slumping player to a part-time role. Things came to a head when Gehrig struggled to make a routine put-out at first base. The pitcher, Johnny Murphy, had to wait for him to drag himself over to the bag so he could field the throw. Murphy said, "Nice play, Lou." Gehrig's later assessment was very dismissive. "That was the simplest play you could ever make in baseball, and I knew then: There was something wrong with me".

On April 30, Gehrig went hitless against the Washington Senators. He had just played his 2,130th consecutive major league game. On May 2, the next game after a day off, Gehrig approached McCarthy before the game in Detroit against the Tigers and said, "I'm benching myself, Joe", telling the Yankees' skipper that he was doing so "for the good of the team". McCarthy acquiesced, putting Ellsworth "Babe" Dahlgren in at first base, and also said that whenever Gehrig felt he could play again, the position was his. Gehrig, as Yankee captain, himself took the lineup card out to the shocked umpires before the game, ending the 14-year streak. Before the game began, the Briggs Stadium announcer told the fans, "Ladies and gentlemen, this is the first time Lou Gehrig's name will not appear on the Yankee lineup in 2,130 consecutive games." The Detroit Tigers' fans gave Gehrig a standing ovation while he sat on the bench with tears in his eyes. Coincidentally, among those attending the game was Wally Pipp, whom Gehrig had replaced at first base 2,130 games previously. A wire-service photograph of Gehrig reclining against the dugout steps with a stoic expression appeared the next day in the nation's newspapers. He stayed with the Yankees as team captain for the rest of the season, but never played in a major-league game again.

Diagnosis
As Gehrig's debilitation became steadily worse, his wife Eleanor called the Mayo Clinic in Rochester, Minnesota. Her call was transferred to Charles William Mayo, who had been following Gehrig's career and his mysterious loss of strength. Mayo told Eleanor to bring Gehrig as soon as possible.

Gehrig flew alone to Rochester from Chicago, where the Yankees were playing at the time, and arrived at the Mayo Clinic on June 13, 1939. After six days of extensive testing at the clinic, doctors confirmed the diagnosis of amyotrophic lateral sclerosis (ALS) on June 19, 1939, which was Gehrig's 36th birthday. The prognosis was grim: rapidly increasing paralysis, difficulty in swallowing and speaking, and a life expectancy less than three years, although no impairment of mental functions would occur. Eleanor Gehrig was told that the cause of ALS was unknown, but that it was painless, not contagious, and cruel; the motor function of the central nervous system is destroyed, but the mind remains fully aware until the end.
Gehrig often wrote letters to Eleanor, and one such note written shortly after the diagnosis said in part:

Following Gehrig's visit to the Mayo Clinic, he briefly rejoined the Yankees in Washington, D.C. As his train pulled into Union Station, he was greeted by a group of Boy Scouts happily waving and wishing him luck. Gehrig waved back, but he leaned forward to his companion, Rutherford "Rud" Rennie of the New York Herald Tribune, and said, "They're wishing me luck — and I'm dying."

Possibility of CTE

Although Gehrig's symptoms were consistent with ALS and he did not experience the wild mood swings and eruptions of uncontrolled violence that define chronic traumatic encephalopathy (CTE), an article in the September 2010 issue of the Journal of Neuropathology & Experimental Neurology suggested the possibility that some ALS-related illnesses diagnosed in Gehrig and other athletes may have been CTE, catalyzed by repeated concussions and other brain trauma. In 2012, Minnesota state representative Phyllis Kahn sought to change the law protecting the privacy of Gehrig's medical records, which are held by the Mayo Clinic, in an effort to determine if a connection could exist between his illness and the concussion-related trauma that he had received during his career (Gehrig also played fullback on the football team at Columbia University, and had a long history of concussions, including several incidents in which he lost consciousness. He played through these injuries).

Gehrig played prior to the advent of batting helmets. To diagnose CTE would require autopsy results; none was conducted on Gehrig before his remains were cremated following his open-casket wake. Multiple physicians have argued that examining records alone would be fruitless.

Retirement

The doctors of the Mayo Clinic had released their ALS diagnosis to the public on June 19, 1939. Two days later, the New York Yankees announced Gehrig's retirement, with an immediate public push to honor him. The idea of an appreciation day reportedly began with Bill Hirsch, a friend of sports columnist Bill Corum, who wrote of the idea in his column. Other sportswriters picked up on the idea and promoted it in their respective publications. Some suggested that the appreciation day be held during the All-Star Game, but when Yankees president Ed Barrow heard the idea, he quickly shot down the suggestion. He did not want Gehrig to share the spotlight with any other all-star. Believing that the idea was valid and should be brought to fruition, Barrow wanted the appreciation day to occur soon, and the Yankees proclaimed Tuesday, July 4, 1939 "Lou Gehrig Appreciation Day" at Yankee Stadium. Between games of the Independence Day doubleheader against the Washington Senators, the poignant ceremonies were held on the diamond. In its coverage the following day, The New York Times wrote that the ceremony was "perhaps as colorful and dramatic a pageant as ever was enacted on a baseball field [as] 61,808 fans thundered a hail and farewell". Dignitaries and members of the Murderers' Row lineup attended the ceremonies and praised Gehrig. New York mayor Fiorello La Guardia called Gehrig the "perfect prototype of the best sportsmanship and citizenship" and Postmaster General James Farley concluded his speech by predicting, "Your name will live long in baseball and wherever the game is played they will point with pride and satisfaction to your record."

Yankees manager Joe McCarthy then spoke of Gehrig, a close friend. Struggling to control his emotions, McCarthy described Gehrig as "the finest example of a ballplayer, sportsman, and citizen that baseball has ever known." He turned tearfully to Gehrig and said, "Lou, what else can I say except that it was a sad day in the life of everybody who knew you when you came into my hotel room that day in Detroit and told me you were quitting as a ballplayer because you felt yourself a hindrance to the team. My God, man, you were never that."

The Yankees retired Gehrig's uniform number 4, making him the first player in Major League Baseball history to be accorded that honor. Gehrig was given many gifts, commemorative plaques, and trophies. Some were presented by VIPs and others came from the stadium's groundskeepers and janitorial staff. As Gehrig was handed the gifts, he would immediately place them on the ground, as he no longer had the arm strength to hold them. The Yankees presented him with a silver trophy bearing all of their engraved signatures. Inscribed on the front was a poem written by New York Times writer John Kieran at the players' request. The inscription read:

The trophy became one of Gehrig's most prized possessions. It is currently on display at the National Baseball Hall of Fame and Museum.

"The luckiest man on the face of the earth"

On July 4, 1939, Gehrig delivered what has been called "baseball's Gettysburg Address" to a sold-out crowd at Yankee Stadium. Having always avoided public attention, Gehrig did not want to speak, but the crowd chanted for him and he had memorized some sentences beforehand.

Only four sentences of the speech exist in recorded form; complete versions of the speech are assembled from newspaper accounts.

The crowd stood and applauded for almost two minutes. Gehrig was visibly shaken as he stepped back from the microphone, and wiped the tears away from his face with his handkerchief. His sometimes-estranged former teammate Babe Ruth hugged him as a band played "I Love You Truly" and the crowd chanted, "We love you, Lou!" The New York Times account the following day called the moment "one of the most touching scenes ever witnessed on a ball field" that made even hard-boiled reporters "swallow hard."

Later life

Gehrig played his last game for the Yankees on April 30, 1939. On July 11 of that year, he appeared at the All-Star Game at Yankee Stadium as the American League team captain, officially on the roster as a reserve player, exchanging lineup cards prior to the game.

Following his retirement from baseball, Gehrig wrote, "Don't think I am depressed or pessimistic about my condition at present." Struggling against his ever-worsening physical condition, he added, "I intend to hold on as long as possible and then if the inevitable comes, I will accept it philosophically and hope for the best. That's all we can do."

In October 1939, he accepted Mayor Fiorello La Guardia's appointment to a 10-year term as a New York City parole commissioner (Gehrig had moved from New Rochelle to Riverdale to satisfy a residency requirement for the job) and was sworn into office on January 2, 1940. The Parole Commission commended Gehrig for his "firm belief in parole, properly administered", stating that Gehrig "indicated he accepted the parole post because it represented an opportunity for public service. He had rejected other job offers — including lucrative speaking and guest appearance opportunities — worth far more financially than the $5,700 a year commissionership." Gehrig visited New York City's correctional facilities but insisted that the visits not be covered by news media. He was often helped by his wife Eleanor, who would guide his hand when he had to sign official documents. When Gehrig's deteriorating physical condition made it impossible for him to continue, he quietly resigned from the position, about a month before his death.

Death
At 10:10p.m. on June 2, 1941, 17 days before his 38th birthday, Gehrig died at his home at 5204 Delafield Avenue in the Riverdale neighborhood of the Bronx, New York. Upon hearing the news, Babe Ruth and his wife Claire went to the Gehrig house to console Eleanor. Mayor La Guardia ordered flags in New York to be flown at half-staff, and major-league ballparks around the nation did likewise.

Thousands viewed Gehrig's body at the Church of the Divine Paternity. Ruth cut in line ahead of everyone and wept in front of the casket. Gehrig's ashes were locked into a crypt in the stone monument marking his grave. Gehrig and Ed Barrow are interred in the same section of the cemetery, which is next door to Gate of Heaven, where the graves of Babe Ruth and Billy Martin lie in Section 25.

Eleanor never remarried and was quoted as saying, "I had the best of it. I would not have traded two minutes of my life with that man for 40 years with another." She dedicated the remainder of her life to supporting ALS research. She died 43 years after Gehrig on her 80th birthday, March 6, 1984, and was interred with him in Kensico Cemetery.

Legacy

Statistical accomplishments 
Despite playing in the shadow of Ruth for two-thirds of his career, Gehrig was one of the highest run producers in baseball history; he had 509 RBIs during a three-season stretch (1930–32). Only two other players, Jimmie Foxx with 507 and Hank Greenberg with 503, have surpassed 500 RBIs in any three seasons; their totals were not consecutive. (Babe Ruth had 498.) Playing 14 complete seasons, Gehrig had 13 consecutive seasons with 100 or more RBIs (a major-league record shared with Foxx and tied in 2010 by Alex Rodriguez).

Gehrig had six seasons where he batted .350 or better (with a high of .379 in 1930), plus a seventh season at .349. Gehrig led the American League in runs scored four times, home runs three times, and RBIs five times. On the single-season RBI list, Gehrig ranks second, fifth (175), and sixth (174), with four additional seasons of over 150 RBIs.

He also holds the baseball record for most seasons with 400 total bases or more, accomplishing this feat five times in his career. He batted fourth in the lineup behind Ruth, making intentionally walking Ruth counterproductive for opposing pitchers.

Lefty Grove, one of the AL's best pitchers during Gehrig's playing days who often threw the ball at batters, refrained from doing so to Gehrig. "You can never tell what that big fellow will do if you get him mad at you," Grove explained.

Comparisons with Ruth 
Unlike Ruth, Gehrig had the physique of a power hitter. Ruth usually hit home runs as high fly balls, while Gehrig's were line drives. During the 10 seasons (1925–1934) in which Gehrig and Ruth were teammates and next to each other in the batting order and played a majority of the games, Gehrig had more home runs than Ruth only once, in 1934 (Ruth's last year with the Yankees, as a 39-year-old), when he hit 49 to Ruth's 22 (Ruth played 125 games that year, and a handful in 1935 before retiring). They tied at 46 in 1931. Ruth had 424 home runs compared to Gehrig's 347; however, Gehrig outpaced Ruth in RBIs, 1,436 to 1,316. Gehrig had a .343 batting average, compared to .338 for Ruth, during this period.

Hall of Fame 
During a winter meeting of the Baseball Writers' Association on December 7, 1939, Gehrig was elected to the Baseball Hall of Fame in a special election related to his illness. At age 36, he was the youngest player to be so honored to date (that figure was surpassed by Sandy Koufax in 1972). He never had a formal induction ceremony. On July 28, 2013, Gehrig and 11 other deceased ballplayers, including Rogers Hornsby, received a special tribute during the induction ceremony, held during "Hall of Fame Induction Weekend", July 26–29 in Cooperstown, New York.

Monument 
The Yankees dedicated a monument to Gehrig in center field at Yankee Stadium on July 6, 1941; the shrine lauded him as "A man, a gentleman and a great ballplayer whose amazing record of 2,130 consecutive games should stand for all time." Gehrig's monument joined the one placed there in 1932 to Miller Huggins, which would eventually be followed by Babe Ruth's in 1949.

Memorial plaques 
Gehrig's birthplace in Manhattan at 1994 Second Avenue, near E. 103rd Street, is memorialized with a plaque marking the site, as is another early residence on 309 E. 94th Street, near Second Avenue. , the first-mentioned plaque is not present due to ongoing construction. The second-mentioned plaque is present, but ascribes to his birthplace, not early residence. Gehrig died in a white house at 5204 Delafield Avenue in the Riverdale section of the Bronx. The house still stands today on the east side of the Henry Hudson Parkway and is likewise marked by a plaque.

Lou Gehrig Memorial Award 
The Lou Gehrig Memorial Award is given annually to an MLB player who best exhibits the character and integrity of Gehrig, off and on the field. The award was created by the Phi Delta Theta fraternity in honor of Gehrig, who was a member of the fraternity at Columbia University. It was first presented in 1955, fourteen years after Gehrig's death. The award's purpose is to recognize a player's exemplary contributions in "both his community and philanthropy." The bestowal of the award is overseen by the headquarters of the Phi Delta Theta fraternity in Oxford, Ohio, and the name of each winner is inscribed onto the Lou Gehrig Award plaque in the Baseball Hall of Fame in Cooperstown.

Medical center 
The ALS treatment and research center at his alma mater, Columbia University, is named The Eleanor and Lou Gehrig ALS Center. Located at NewYork-Presbyterian Hospital and Columbia University Irving Medical Center, they have a clinical and research function directed at ALS and the related motor neuron diseases primary lateral sclerosis and progressive muscular atrophy.

Lou Gehrig Day 
In March 2021, Major League Baseball declared June 2 henceforth to be Lou Gehrig Day. June 2 was chosen because it is the anniversary of when Gehrig became the Yankees' starting first baseman in 1925 and when he died in 1941.

Records, awards, and accomplishments
Sixty years after his farewell to baseball, Gehrig received the most votes of any baseball player on the Major League Baseball All-Century Team, chosen by fan balloting in 1999.

In 1999, editors at Sporting News ranked Gehrig sixth on their list of "Baseball's 100 Greatest Players".

Records

Awards and honors

Other accomplishments

Film and other media

Gehrig starred in the 1938 20th Century Fox movie Rawhide, playing himself in his only feature-film appearance. In 2006, researchers presented a paper to the American Academy of Neurology, reporting on an analysis of Rawhide and photographs of Gehrig from the 1937–1939 period, to ascertain when he began to show visible symptoms of ALS. They concluded that while atrophy of hand muscles could be detected in 1939 photographs of him, no such abnormality was visible at the time Rawhide was made in January 1938. "Examination of Rawhide showed that Gehrig functioned normally in January 1938", the report concluded.

Gehrig's life was the subject of the 1942 film The Pride of the Yankees, starring Gary Cooper as Gehrig and Teresa Wright as his wife. It received 11 Academy Award nominations and won in one category, Film Editing. Former Yankee teammates Babe Ruth, Bob Meusel, Mark Koenig, and Bill Dickey (then still an active player) played themselves, as did sportscaster Bill Stern. In 2008, the AFI honored The Pride of the Yankees as the third-best sports picture ever made.

The 1978 TV movie A Love Affair: The Eleanor and Lou Gehrig Story starred Blythe Danner and Edward Herrmann as Eleanor and Lou Gehrig. It was based on the 1976 autobiography My Luke and I, written by Eleanor Gehrig and Joseph Durso.

In an episode of the PBS series Jean Shepherd's America, the Chicago-born Jean Shepherd told of how his father (Jean Shepherd, Sr.) and he would watch Chicago White Sox games from the right-field upper deck at Comiskey Park in the 1930s. On one occasion, the Sox were playing the Yankees, and Shepherd Sr. had been taunting Gehrig, yelling at him all day. In the top of the ninth, with Sox icon Ted Lyons holding a slim lead, Gehrig came to bat with a man on base, and the senior Shepherd yelled in a voice that echoed around the ballpark, "Hit one up here, ya bum! I dare ya!" Gehrig did exactly that, hitting a screaming liner, practically into the heckler's lap, for the eventual game-winning home run. Shepherd's father was booed mercilessly, and he never again took junior Jean to a game. He apparently told this story originally when Gehrig's widow was in the audience at a speaking engagement.

His digital likeness and the opening quote of the "baseball's Gettysburg Address" are featured in All Star Baseball 2004.

See also

 Home run records
 Career home run leaders
 Batting champions
 Doubles records
 Annual doubles leaders
 Annual triples leaders
 Annual home run leaders
 Annual runs scored leaders
 Annual RBI leaders
 RBI records
 Players who spent their entire career with one franchise
 Career triples leaders
 Career doubles leaders
 Career RBI leaders
 Career runs scored leaders
 Career hits leaders
 List of Major League Baseball career total bases leaders
 List of Major League Baseball players to hit for the cycle
 MLB titles leaders

References

Further reading
 Transcript and Audio of Lou Gehrig's Farewell to Baseball Address
 New York Times obituary at The Deadball Era
 
 
 
 Kashatus, William C. Lou Gehrig: A Biography. Greenwood Press, 2004. .

External links

 
 Website for the Eleanor and Lou Gehrig ALS Center at NewYork-Presbyterian / Columbia University Medical Center

1903 births
1941 deaths
20th-century American male actors
American League All-Stars
American League batting champions
American League home run champions
American League Most Valuable Player Award winners
American League RBI champions
American League Triple Crown winners
American people of German descent
Burials at Kensico Cemetery
National College Baseball Hall of Fame inductees
Columbia Lions baseball players
Columbia Lions football players
Columbia College (New York) alumni
Deaths from motor neuron disease
Hartford Senators players
Major League Baseball first basemen
Major League Baseball players with retired numbers
National Baseball Hall of Fame inductees
Neurological disease deaths in New York (state)
New York Yankees players
People from Riverdale, Bronx
People from Yorkville, Manhattan
Sportspeople from Manhattan
Baseball players from New York City
Sportspeople from New Rochelle, New York